This is a list of the 100 busiest airports in the Nordic countries by passengers per year, aircraft movements per year and freight and mail tonnes per year.

The list also includes yearly statistics for the busiest metropolitan airport systems and the busiest air-routes for 2012.

This transport-related list is intended to be regularly updated as new statistics become available from the relevant official authorities.



Nordic countries

The Nordic countries make up a region in Northern Europe and the North Atlantic which consists of Denmark, Finland, Iceland, Norway and Sweden and their associated territories which include the Faroe Islands, Greenland and Åland. "Scandinavia" is sometimes used as a synonym for the Nordic countries, although within the Nordic countries the terms are considered distinct, especially since Scandinavia is by definition made up of the countries Denmark, Norway and Sweden.

The region's five sovereign states and three autonomous regions share much common history as well as common traits in their respective societies, such as political systems and the Nordic model.

Politically, Nordic countries do not form a separate entity, but they co-operate in the Nordic Council. Linguistically, the area is heterogeneous, with three unrelated language groups, the North Germanic branch of Indo-European languages and the Finnic and Sami branches of Uralic languages as well as the Eskimo–Aleut language Greenlandic spoken in Greenland.

The Nordic countries have a combined population of approximately 27 million spread over a land area of 3.5 million km2 (Greenland accounts for 60% of the total area).

Passengers

At a glance

2022 statistics

Airports for which figures are not available but are likely to be among top 100 include:
Stord Airport
Kangerlussuaq Airport
Nuuk Airport
Ilulissat Airport
Ísafjörður Airport
The ranking does not include these airports.

2021 statistics

Airports for which figures are not available but are likely to be among top 100 include:
Kangerlussuaq Airport
Nuuk Airport
Ilulissat Airport
Ísafjörður Airport
The ranking does not include these airports.

2020 statistics

Airports for which figures are not available but are likely to be among top 100 include:
Kangerlussuaq Airport
Nuuk Airport
Ilulissat Airport
Narsarsuaq Airport
Ísafjörður Airport
The ranking does not include these airports.
Greenland airport administration publishes a figure of 87,672 for Kangerlussuaq and Narsarsuaq together, and 124,762 for all other airports together.

2020 COVID-19 statistics
For the purpose of documenting the large decline in air travel during the COVID-19 pandemic, figures for April 2020 are compared with April 2019 (for the 50 busiest airports).

2019 statistics

2018 statistics

International and domestic

2017 statistics

International and domestic

2016 statistics

2015 statistics

2014 statistics

International and domestic

2013 statistics

2012 statistics

Aircraft movements
Note: The statistics provided below do not include any movements by aircraft registered as military or touch and goes.

2012 statistics

Freight and mail tonnes
Note: The statistics below are provided in metric tonnes with three decimal digits, i.e. with an accuracy of number of kilograms handled at each airport. The statistics do not include belly cargo transported on regular or charter passenger flights.

2012 statistics

Greenlandic airports are excluded from this list because of lack of information. The ranking does not include Greenlandic airports.

Busiest metropolitan air-traffic regions

2016 statistics

2015 statistics

2014 statistics

2013 statistics (provisional)

2012 statistics

Passengers

Aircraft movements
Note: The statistics provided below do not include any movements by aircraft registered as military or touch and goes.

Freight and mail tonnes
Note: The statistics below are provided in metric tonnes with three decimal digits, i.e. with an accuracy of number of kilograms handled at each airport. The statistics do not include belly cargo transported on regular or charter passenger flights.

Busiest air routes
Included below are statistics for the busiest air routes in terms of total passengers on board. When air traffic exists to/from or between secondary airports for a city/region, the secondary airports are included in the statistics below according to the footnotes. The main airport is defined as the airport handling the highest number of passengers for each city/region.

Busiest intra-Nordic air routes
These statistics include total passengers on-board between and within the Nordic countries.

1 Includes Oslo Airport, Moss Airport Rygge and Torp Sandefjord Airport
2 Includes Oslo Airport and Torp Sandefjord Airport
3 Includes Stockholm Arlanda Airport and Bromma Stockholm Airport
4 In these statistics Malmö and Helsingborg/Ängelholm are separated from Copenhagen/Roskilde. When these airports in the Øresund region are considered together, flights between this region and Stockholm carried 2,885,369 passengers in 2012 and 2,789,626 in 2019, making this the busiest intra-Nordic air corridor.

Busiest intra–European Union air routes
These statistics include total passenger on-board between the Nordic countries and other countries within the European Union and member states of the European Free Trade Association. At the time these values refer to, the United Kingdom was part of the European Union, and is therefore still listed here.

1 Includes London Heathrow Airport, London Gatwick Airport, London Stansted Airport and/or London Luton Airport
2 Includes Stockholm Arlanda Airport, Stockholm Skavsta Airport and Stockholm Västerås Airport
3 Includes Oslo Airport, Moss Airport Rygge and Torp Sandefjord Airport
4 Includes Paris Charles de Gaulle Airport and Paris Orly Airport
5 Includes Oslo Airport and Torp Sandefjord Airport
6 Includes Stockholm Arlanda Airport and Stockholm Skavsta Airport
7 Includes Frankfurt Airport and Frankfurt Hahn Airport
8 Includes London Heathrow Airport and London Gatwick Airport
9 Includes Paris Charles de Gaulle Airport and Paris Beauvais Tillé Airport
10 Includes Göteborg Landvetter Airport, and Göteborg City Airport
11 Includes Berlin Tegel Airport and Berlin Schönefeld Airport
12 Includes Oslo Airport and Moss Airport Rygge
13 Includes Paris Charles de Gaulle Airport, Paris Orly Airport and Paris Beauvais Tillé Airport
14 Includes Munich Airport and Allgäu Airport Memmingen
15 Includes Barcelona–El Prat Airport and Girona–Costa Brava Airport
16 Includes Brussels Airport and Brussels-Charleroi Airport
17 Includes Rome-Fiumicino Airport and Rome-Ciampino Airport
18 Refers to Keflavík Airport

Busiest extra–European Union air routes
These statistics include total passengers on board between the Nordic countries and countries outside of the European Union and non-member states of the European Free Trade Association.

1 Includes the new Istanbul Airport, Istanbul Atatürk Airport and Istanbul Sabiha Gökçen International Airport
2 Includes Oslo Airport and Torp Sandefjord Airport
3 Includes John F. Kennedy International Airport and Newark Liberty International Airport
4 Includes Newark Liberty International Airport
5 Includes Narita International Airport
6 Includes Sheremetyevo International Airport
7 Includes Keflavík International Airport
8 Includes Washington-Dulles and Baltimore-Washington airports

Gallery

See also

List of the busiest airports in Europe
List of busiest airports by passenger traffic
List of busiest passenger air routes

References

No
Airports, Nordic Countries
Busiest
Nordic countries